The Latest and the Greatest is the fourth compilation album by American country music duo The Bellamy Brothers. It was released in 1992 via Bellamy Brothers Records. The albums includes the single "Cowboy Beat".

Track listing

Chart performance

References

1992 compilation albums
The Bellamy Brothers albums